Claudine Wilde (born 15 March 1967) is a German film and television actress.

Early life 
Claudine Wilde was born in Berlin and grew up in the South of France. She received a three-year acting training at the Conservatory of Dramatic Arts in Saint-Étienne and one year at James Logan School in San Francisco Bay Area.

Career 

Wilde has also appeared in French productions especially in theater like Les Misérables engaged in Saint-Étienne.

 1991 : La Totale!
 2003 : Josephine, Guardian Angel (1 Episode : "Belle à tout prix")
 2012 : Big Is Beautiful

Personal life 
Wilde was married from 2001 to 2011 to Czech engineer Tomás Kanok, they separated in 2009. The couple have two sons.

Wilde is fluent in German, English and French. She also has basic knowledge in Spanish and Italian.

References

External links 

1967 births
German film actresses
German television actresses
Actresses from Berlin
Living people
20th-century German actresses
21st-century German actresses